Aisone is a comune (municipality) in the Province of Cuneo in the Italian region Piedmont, located about  southwest of Turin and about  southwest of Cuneo. The mayor is Marisa Rondolino. Aisone borders the following municipalities: Demonte, Valdieri, and Vinadio.

Demographic evolution

References

Cities and towns in Piedmont
Articles which contain graphical timelines